A hierarchical organization or hierarchical organisation (see spelling differences) is an organizational structure where every entity in the organization, except one, is subordinate to a single other entity. This arrangement is a form of a hierarchy. In an organization, the hierarchy usually consists of a singular/group of power at the top with subsequent levels of power beneath them. This is the dominant mode of organization among large organizations; most corporations, governments, criminal enterprises, and organized religions are hierarchical organizations with different levels of management, power or authority. For example, the broad, top-level overview of the general organization of the Catholic Church consists of the Pope, then the Cardinals, then the Archbishops, and so on. 

Members of hierarchical organizational structures chiefly communicate with their immediate superior and with their immediate subordinates. Structuring organizations in this way is useful partly because it can reduce the communication overhead by limiting information flow.

Visualization
A hierarchy is typically visualized as a pyramid, where the height of the ranking or person depicts their power status and the width of that level represents how many people or business divisions are at that level relative to the whole—the highest-ranking people are at the apex, and there are very few of them, and in many cases only one; the base may include thousands of people who have no subordinates. These hierarchies are typically depicted with a tree or triangle diagram, creating an organizational chart or organogram. Those nearest the top have more power than those nearest the bottom, and there being fewer people at the top than at the bottom. As a result, superiors in a hierarchy generally have higher status and command greater rewards than their subordinates.

Common social manifestations 
All governments and most  companies feature similar hierarchical structures. Traditionally, the monarch stood at the pinnacle of the state. In many countries, feudalism and manorialism provided a formal social structure that established hierarchical links pervading every level of society, with the monarch at the top. 

In modern post-feudal states the nominal top of the hierarchy still remains a head of state – sometimes a  president or a constitutional monarch, although in many modern states the powers of the head of state are delegated among different bodies. Below or alongside this head there is commonly a senate, parliament or congress; such bodies in turn often delegate the day-to-day running of the country to a prime minister, who may head a  cabinet. In many democracies, constitutions theoretically regard  "the people" as the notional top of the hierarchy, above the head of state; in reality, the people's influence is often restricted to voting in elections or in referendums.

In  business, the business owner traditionally occupies the pinnacle of the organization. Most modern large companies lack a single dominant shareholder and for most purposes delegate the collective power of the business owners to a board of directors, which in turn delegates the day-to-day running of the company to a managing director or CEO. Again, although the shareholders of the company nominally rank at the top of the hierarchy, in reality many companies are run at least in part as personal fiefdoms by their  management; corporate governance rules attempt to mitigate this tendency.

Origins and development of social hierarchical organizations 

Smaller and more informal social units –  families,  bands, tribes, special interest groups – which may form spontaneously, have little need for complex hierarchies – or indeed for any hierarchies. They may rely on  self-organizing tendencies.
A conventional view ascribes the growth of hierarchical social habits and structures to increased complexity;
the religious syncretism
and issues of tax-gathering
in expanding empires played a role here.

The demands of  administration in increasingly larger systems may have assisted the flowering of bureaucracy and in the advent of the professional manager (19th century) and of the  technocrat (20th century).

Studies 
The organizational development theorist Elliott Jacques identified a special role for hierarchy in his concept of requisite organization. 
 
The iron law of oligarchy, introduced by Robert Michels, describes the inevitable tendency of hierarchical organizations to become oligarchic in their decision making.

The Peter Principle is a term coined by Laurence J. Peter in which the selection of a candidate for a position in an  hierarchical organization is based on the candidate's performance in their current role, rather than on abilities relevant to the intended role. Thus, employees only stop being promoted once they can no longer perform effectively, and managers in an hierarchical organization "rise to the level of their incompetence." 

Hierarchiology is another term coined by Laurence J. Peter, described in his humorous book of the same name, to refer to the study of hierarchical organizations and the behavior of their members.

David Andrews' book The IRG Solution: Hierarchical Incompetence and how to Overcome it argued that hierarchies were inherently incompetent, and were only able to function due to large amounts of informal lateral communication fostered by private informal networks.

Criticism and alternatives
In the work of diverse theorists such as William James (1842–1910), Michel Foucault (1926–1984) and Hayden White, important critiques of hierarchical epistemology are advanced. James famously asserts in his work "Radical Empiricism" that clear distinctions of type and category are a constant but unwritten goal of scientific reasoning, so that when they are discovered, success is declared. But if aspects of the world are organized differently, involving inherent and intractable ambiguities, then scientific questions are often considered unresolved. A hesitation to declare success upon the discovery of ambiguities leaves heterarchy at an artificial and subjective disadvantage in the scope of human knowledge. This bias is an artifact of an aesthetic or pedagogical preference for hierarchy, and not necessarily an expression of objective observation.

Hierarchies and hierarchical thinking has been criticized by many people, including Susan McClary and one political philosophy which is vehemently opposed to hierarchical organization: anarchism. Heterarchy is the most commonly proposed alternative to hierarchy and this has been combined with responsible autonomy by Gerard Fairtlough in his work on Triarchy theory. The most beneficial aspect of a hierarchical organization is the clear command that is established. However, hierarchy may become dismantled by abuse of power.

Amidst constant innovation in information and communication technologies, hierarchical authority structures are giving way to greater decision-making latitude for individuals and more flexible definitions of job activities and; this new style of work presents a challenge to existing organizational forms, with some research studies contrasting traditional organizational forms against groups that operate as online communities that are characterized by personal motivation and the satisfaction of making one's own decisions.  With all levels of an organization having access to information and communication via digital means, power structures align more as a wirearchy, enabling the flow of power and authority to be based not on hierarchical levels, but on information, trust, credibility, and a focus on results.

See also

References

Hierarchy
Organizational structure
Corporate governance
Bureaucratic organization